Cosmogenesis is the second studio album by German death metal band Obscura. It was released on 17 February 2009 by Relapse Records. The album debuted at No. 71 on the Top Heatseekers chart.

A music video was released for the song "Anticosmic Overload". The songs "Desolate Spheres" and "Centric Flow" are based on the poem "The Dance of Shiva".

Cosmogenesis was awarded "Best Death Metal Album of the year 2009" by Loudwire.

Track listing

Credits 
Writing, performance and production credits are adapted from the album liner notes.

Personnel 
Obscura
 Steffen Kummerer – guitar, vocals
 Christian Münzner – guitar
 Jeroen Paul Thesseling – fretless bass
 Hannes Grossmann – drums

Guest musicians
 Victor Bullok a.k.a. V. Santura (Dark Fortress, Triptykon) – backing vocals on "Universe Momentum," "Desolate Spheres," "Noospheres," "Centric Flow"

Additional musicians
 Tymon Kruidenier (ex-Cynic) – guitar solo on "Choir of Spirits"
 Ron Jarzombek – guitar solo on "Cosmogenesis"

Production
 Obscura – production
 Victor Bullok – production, recording, mixing, mastering

Artwork and design
 Orion Landau – design
 Norudos – photography

References

External links 
 

2009 albums
Obscura (band) albums
Relapse Records albums